COP9 signalosome complex subunit 8 is a protein that in humans is encoded by the COPS8 gene.

The protein encoded by this gene is the smallest of the eight subunits of COP9 signalosome, a highly conserved protein complex that functions as an important regulator in multiple signaling pathways. The structure and function of COP9 signalosome is related to that of the 19S regulatory particle of 26S proteasome. COP9 signalosome has been shown to interact with SCF-type E3 ubiquitin ligases and act as a positive regulator of E3 ubiquitin ligases. Alternatively spliced transcript variants encoding distinct isoforms have been observed.

References

External links

Further reading